Amauris ellioti, Ansorge's danaid, is a butterfly in the family Nymphalidae. It is found in the Democratic Republic of the Congo, Uganda, Rwanda, Burundi, Kenya, Tanzania, Malawi and Zambia. The habitat consists of semi-montane forests.

The larvae feed on Tylophora stolzii, Tylophora anomala, Marsdenia racemosa, Gongronema latifolium, Cynanchum, Gymnema and Secamone species.

Subspecies
Amauris ellioti ellioti (eastern Democratic Republic of the Congo, western Uganda, Rwanda, Burundi)
Amauris ellioti altumi van Someren, 1936 (Kenya: east of the Rift Valley, Tanzania)
Amauris ellioti ansorgei Sharpe, 1896 (Uganda: western slopes of Mount Elgon, Kenya: west of the Rift Valley)
Amauris ellioti junia (Le Cerf, 1920) (northern Malawi, Zambia, Tanzania: north, central and southern highlands)

References

Seitz, A. Die Gross-Schmetterlinge der Erde 13: Die Afrikanischen Tagfalter. Plate XIII 24 ssp. ansorgei
Seitz, A. Die Gross-Schmetterlinge der Erde 13: Die Afrikanischen Tagfalter. Plate XIII 25

Butterflies described in 1895
Amauris
Butterflies of Africa